The Men's Individual Class 1 table tennis competition at the 2008 Summer Paralympics was held between 7 September and 11 September at the Peking University Gymnasium.

Classes 1-5 were for athletes with a physical impairment that affected their legs, who competed in a sitting position. The lower the number, the greater the impact the impairment was on an athlete’s ability to compete.

The event was won by Andreas Vevera, representing .

Results

Preliminary round

Group A

Group B

Competition bracket

References

M